The Grande-Rivière station was a Via Rail station in Grande-Rivière, Quebec, Canada. It was located on Rue du Parc and was an optional stop marked by a sign post. It served the Montreal–Gaspé train until 2013, when the line was closed east of Matapédia station. It is unknown if or when service to Gaspé will resume.

References

Via Rail stations in Quebec
Railway stations in Gaspésie–Îles-de-la-Madeleine
Disused railway stations in Canada